Robert Spurgeon Bloxom Jr. (born February 12, 1963) is an American businessman and politician from the Commonwealth of Virginia. He is a member of the Virginia House of Delegates from the 100th district, succeeding Lynwood Lewis. Bloxom is a member of the Republican Party.

Bloxom's father, Robert Bloxom Sr., served in the House of Delegates before becoming Virginia Secretary of Agriculture and Forestry.

Bloxom currently serves as a member of the Privileges and Elections Committee, the Appropriations Committee, and the Agriculture, Chesapeake, and Natural Resources Committee.

References

External links

1963 births
Living people
21st-century American politicians
Republican Party members of the Virginia House of Delegates
People from Salisbury, Maryland
People from Accomack County, Virginia